Tuyalyas (Töyäläś) is a rural locality (a selo) in Sibay, Bashkortostan, Russia. The population was 1,075 as of 2010. There are 9 streets.

Geography 
Tuyalyas is located 19 km north of Sibay. Kazanka is the nearest rural locality.

References 

Rural localities in Bashkortostan